Martin Everardus Reyners (born 1950), Auckland, New Zealand FRSNZ Ph.D., is a New Zealand geophysicist and seismologist.  He is a Principal Scientist at the Institute of Geological and Nuclear Sciences (GNS Science), Lower Hutt,  and is a specialist in subinduction zones, especially in relation to New Zealand.

Education
He was educated at St Peter's College, Auckland and the University of Auckland, completing a PhD in geophysics in 1978.

Career
His work has "enabled three-dimensional tomographic imaging of the structure of the colliding plates" and has so shown the modus operandi of plate tectonics under New Zealand, especially in relation to the Taupo Volcanic Zone, which is "the most frequently active and productive silicic volcanic system on Earth." He has cast light on the mysterious termination of volcanic activity at Mt Ruapehu and its non-continuation with the subducted Pacific plate further south under New Zealand"
He is currently examining why the New Zealand tectonic plates are jammed together in some places because, if these unjam, there could be a large earthquake

He is a fellow of the Royal Society of New Zealand (FRSNZ), and  has been awarded the Hochstetter Lectureship,  and (twice) the New Zealand Geophysics Prize.

See also
 Dr. Reyner's scientific publications: 
 For some more biographical details: List of alumni of St Peter's College, Auckland

Notes

External links
GNS Science

1950 births
People from Auckland
Living people
People educated at St Peter's College, Auckland
University of Auckland alumni
New Zealand seismologists
New Zealand geophysicists
Fellows of the Royal Society of New Zealand